Louis Jean Heydt (April 17, 1903 – January 29, 1960) was an American character actor  in film, television and theatre, most frequently seen in hapless, ineffectual, or fall guy roles.

Early life
Heydt was born in 1903 (not 1905, as many sources have it) in Montclair, New Jersey, the son of German parents George Frederick Heydt, a jeweler and the secretary and executor  for Louis Comfort Tiffany, and the former Emma Foerster.

He was educated at Montclair High School, Worcester Academy. and Dartmouth College, graduating from the latter in 1926. He initially wanted to be a journalist and worked as a reporter for The New York World.

Career

Stage
Heydt received his start in the theatre while visiting a classmate backstage while The Trial of Mary Dugan was in rehearsal. As an actual reporter, he caught the attention of the producers and was offered the role of a reporter in the play. He made his stage debut therein and went on to appear in a dozen plays, including Strictly Dishonorable, Before Morning and Happy Birthday.  He also played in the London company of The Trial of Mary Dugan as the male lead, replacing the deceased Rex Cherryman.

After he left the Broadway production of The Trial of Mary Dugan, Heydt acted in stock theatre with the Alice Brady Company in Buffalo, Rochester, and Toronto. In the mid-1930s, he and his wife were active in summer stock theatre in Skowhegan, Maine.

Film

In the 1930s, Heydt traveled to Hollywood, where he appeared in over a hundred films, including Gone With the Wind (1939), The Great McGinty (1940), Thirty Seconds Over Tokyo (1944) and The Big Sleep (1946).  He made an impression as an older, warm-hearted soldier in the 1945 John Ford PT-boat epic They Were Expendable, and co-starred in the 1951 film noir Roadblock in support of Charles McGraw.

Heyt remained active in Hollywood throughout the 1950s, appearing in 32 films through 1959.

Television
Heydt moved early into television, initially taking roles in basic Westerns and related programs such as outlaw Tom Horn on the 1950s western television series Stories of the Century, starring and narrated by Jim Davis. He appeared in eleven episodes of Richard Carlson's 1958-1959 western series, Mackenzie's Raiders.

Heydt guest starred on the Adventures of Superman, Treasury Men in Action, Cavalcade of America, TV Reader's Digest, Crossroads, Lux Video Theatre, Fury, The Man from Blackhawk, Wagon Train, and Maverick.

Personal life and death
Heydt married Leona Maricle, an actress in the Broadway company of The Trial of Mary Dugan, on August 13, 1928, in New York. He later married Donna Hanor.

Heydt died of a heart attack on January 29, 1960, in Boston, where he collapsed immediately after leaving the stage following the first scene of a pre-Broadway performance of the play, There Was a Little Girl, in which he appeared opposite Jane Fonda. Actor Joseph Curtiss carried him to his dressing room, but it was apparent that he had died instantly.  Heydt's understudy, William Adler, finished the performance and the run.

Partial filmography

 Before Morning (1933) - Neil Kennedy
 Make Way for Tomorrow (1937) - Doctor
 Borrowing Trouble (1937) - Martin (uncredited)
 No Time to Marry (1938) - McClosky
 Test Pilot (1938) - Greg Benson
 They're Always Caught (1938, Short) - Eddie Diesel
 I Am the Law (1938) - John W. Butler
 They Made Me a Criminal (1939) - Smith
 Let Freedom Ring (1939) - Ned Wilkie
 They Made Her a Spy (1939) - Gillian
 The Flying Irishman (1939) - Man Betting Doug Won't Get Off the Ground (uncredited)
 Stronger Than Desire (1939) - Court Appointed Attorney (uncredited)
 Each Dawn I Die (1939) - Lassiter
 Charlie Chan at Treasure Island (1939) - Paul Essex
 Full Confession (1939) - Defense Attorney (uncredited)
 Mr. Smith Goes to Washington (1939) - Soapbox Speaker (uncredited)
 Dad for a Day (1939, Short) - Bill Henry (uncredited)
 Reno (1939) - Judge Jimmy Howard
 Joe and Ethel Turp Call on the President (1939) - Dr. Standish (uncredited)
 A Child Is Born (1939) - Mr. Kempner
 Gone With the Wind (1939) - Hungry Soldier Holding Beau Wilkes
 The Hunchback of Notre Dame (1939) - Minor Role (uncredited)
 Abe Lincoln in Illinois (1940) - Mentor Graham
 Dr. Ehrlich's Magic Bullet (1940) - Dr. Kunze
 Johnny Apollo (1940) - Guard with Doctor (uncredited)
 All About Hash (1940, Short) - Bob Henry, Mickey's father
 Irene (1940) - 'Biffy' Webster - the Columnist (uncredited)
 The Man Who Talked Too Much (1940) - Barton
 The Great McGinty (1940) - Tommy Thompson
 Pier 13 (1940) - Bill Hamilton
 Santa Fe Trail (1940) - Farmer (scenes deleted)
 Let's Make Music (1941) - Mr. Stevens
 High Sierra (1941) - Bob - Tourist at Robbery (uncredited)
 Sleepers West (1941) - Everett Jason
 Power Dive (1941) - Johnny Coles
 Dive Bomber (1941) - Swede Larson
 How Green Was My Valley (1941) - Miner (uncredited)
 Pacific Blackout (1941) - Harold Kermin
 Dr. Kildare's Victory (1942) - Mr. Ray Johnson (uncredited)
 Captains of the Clouds (1942) - Provost Marshal
 Canal Zone (1942) - Ralph Merrill (uncredited)
 Tortilla Flat (1942) - Young Doctor (uncredited)
 Ten Gentlemen from West Point (1942) - Jared Danforth
 Night in New Orleans (1942) - Bit (uncredited)
 The Glass Key (1942) - Man watching dice throw (uncredited)
 Manila Calling (1942) - Harold Watson
 Commandos Strike at Dawn (1942) - Karl Arnesen
 One Dangerous Night (1943) - Arthur
 Mission to Moscow (1943) - American Newsman (uncredited)
 Stage Door Canteen (1943) - Captain Robinson (uncredited)
 First Comes Courage (1943) - Norwegian (uncredited)
 The Iron Major (1943) - Recruiting Sergeant (uncredited)
 Gung Ho! (1943) - Lt.Roland Browning
 The Miracle of Morgan's Creek (1943) - Army Officer (uncredited)
 See Here, Private Hargrove (1944) - Captain Administering Oath (uncredited)
 Her Primitive Man (1944) - Gerald
 The Story of Dr. Wassell (1944) - Ensign (uncredited)
 The Great Moment (1944) - Dr. Horace Wells
 Thirty Seconds Over Tokyo (1944) - Lieut. Miller
 Betrayal from the East (1945) - Jack Marsden
 Zombies on Broadway (1945) - Douglas Walker
 You Came Along (1945) - Navy Man (uncredited)
 Our Vines Have Tender Grapes (1945) - Mr. Faraassen
 They Were Expendable (1945) - 'Ohio'
 To Each His Own (1946) - American Officer (uncredited)
 The Hoodlum Saint (1946) - Mike Flaherty
 The Big Sleep (1946) - Joe Brody
 Gentleman Joe Palooka (1946) - Chairman
 Abie's Irish Rose (1946) - Priest (uncredited)
 That Brennan Girl (1946) - Hefflin (uncredited)
 Sinbad the Sailor (1947) - Mercenary (uncredited)
 I Cover Big Town (1947) - John Moulton
 Spoilers of the North (1947) - Inspector Carl Winters
 California's Golden Beginning (1948, Short)
 Bad Men of Tombstone (1949) - John Stover
 Make Believe Ballroom (1949) - Jerskin Elliott (uncredited)
 Come to the Stable (1949) - Al Newman (uncredited)
 The Kid from Cleveland (1949) - Carl Novak
 Paid in Full (1950) - Dr. Carter, Psychiatrist
 The Furies (1950) - Bailey
 Al Jennings of Oklahoma (1951) - John Jennings
 The Great Missouri Raid (1951) - Charles Ford
 Rawhide (1951) - Fickert
 Raton Pass (1951) - Jim Pozner
 Two of a Kind (1951) - Chief Petty Officer (uncredited)
 Warpath (1951) - Herb Woodson
 Criminal Lawyer (1951) - Frank Burnett
 Drums in the Deep South (1951) - Col. House
 Roadblock (1951) - Harry Miller
 The Day the Earth Stood Still (1951) - Airforce Captain looking perplexed (uncredited)
 Close to My Heart (1951) - Probation Officer Duncan (uncredited)
 The Old West (1952) - Jeff Bleeker
 Sailor Beware (1952) - Naval Doctor (uncredited)
 Mutiny (1952) - Captain Herwig (uncredited)
 Flesh and Fury (1952) - Whitey
 Models Inc. (1952) - Cronin
 The Vanquished (1953) - Luke Taylor (uncredited)
 Island in the Sky (1953) - Fitch
 The Boy from Oklahoma (1954) - Paul Evans
 A Star Is Born (1954) - Ocean Scene Director (uncredited)
 Ten Wanted Men (1955) - Tom Baines (uncredited)
 Many Rivers to Cross (1955) - Noah Crawford (uncredited)
 The Eternal Sea (1955) - Capt. Walter F. Rodee
 No Man's Woman (1955) - Det. Lt. Colton
 Stranger at My Door (1956) - Sheriff John Tatum
 Wetbacks (1956)  - Coast Guard Comdr. Randall
 The Fastest Gun Alive (1956) - Myron Spink (uncredited)
 Official Detective (1957, TV Series) - Detective Herman
 The Wings of Eagles (1957) - Dr. John Keye (uncredited)
 The Badge of Marshal Brennan (1957) - Col. Donaphin
 Raiders of Old California (1957) - Judge Ward Young
 The Man Who Died Twice (1958) - Capt. Andy Hampton
 Inside the Mafia (1959) - Rod Balcom

See also

References

External links

Male actors from New Jersey
1903 births
1960 deaths
American male film actors
American male journalists
20th-century American journalists
American people of German descent
People from Montclair, New Jersey
People from Greater Los Angeles
Burials at Forest Lawn Memorial Park (Glendale)
20th-century American male actors
20th-century American non-fiction writers
20th-century American male writers